Silvers may refer to:

People
 Cathy Silvers (born 1961), American actress and daughter of Phil Silvers
 Herbert Ferber Silvers (1906–1991), American sculptor and painter
 Louis Silvers (1889–1954), American film score composer
 Michael Silvers, sound editor (Pixar)
 Phil Silvers (1911–1985), American entertainer and comedy actor
 Robert B. Silvers (1929-2017), American editor (The New York Review of Books)

Other uses
 Albuquerque Silvers, an American basketball team
 Silvers, a local term for Coho salmon (Oncorhynchus kisutch)
 Silvers Circus, an (Australian) circus

See also
 Silver (disambiguation)
 The Sylvers, a family musical group